is a near-Earth object that is also horseshoe companion to the Earth like 3753 Cruithne.

Discovery, orbit and physical properties 
 was discovered by E. J. Christensen on 6 May 2006, observing for the Catalina Sky Survey. 
Its orbit is characterized by low eccentricity (0.083), low inclination (1.44º) and a semi-major axis of 1.01 AU. Upon discovery, it was classified as an Apollo asteroid but also an Earth crosser by the Minor Planet Center. The orbit is based on 76 observations spanning a data-arc of 4 days.  has an absolute magnitude (H) of 28.4 which gives a characteristic diameter of about 9 meters.

Impact risk 

It is listed on the Sentry Risk Table with a 1 in 210 chance of impacting Earth on 3 May 2074. The nominal best-fit orbit shows that  will be  from Earth on 3 May 2074. An impact from this object would be less severe than the Chelyabinsk meteor.

Horseshoe companion to the Earth and orbital evolution 
Recent calculations indicate that it follows a horseshoe orbit with respect to the Earth. Its orbital evolution is very chaotic and its orbit is difficult to predict beyond a few hundred years. Its orbit matches the expected properties of that of an object in the Arjuna-class.

Origin 
It may have been originated within the Venus–Earth–Mars region or in the main asteroid belt like other near-Earth objects, then transition to Amor-class asteroid before entering Earth's co-orbital region.

See also 

 3753 Cruithne

Notes 

  This is assuming an albedo of 0.20–0.04.

References 
 

Further reading
 A resonant family of dynamically cold small bodies in the near-Earth asteroid belt de la Fuente Marcos, C., de la Fuente Marcos, R. 2013, Monthly Notices of the Royal Astronomical Society: Letters, Vol. 434, Issue 1, pp. L1–L5.

External links 
  data at MPC
  Earth Impact Risk Summary
 MPEC 2006-J38 : 2006 JY26 (Discovery MPEC)
 
 
 

Minor planet object articles (unnumbered)
Discoveries by the Catalina Sky Survey
Earth-crossing asteroids

Potential impact events caused by near-Earth objects
20060506